Dawson Fernandes (born 27 July 1990 in Navelim, Goa) is an Indian professional footballer who plays as a striker. He last played in India for Salgacar in the I-League, and currently plays for Goan United FC in the Middlesex County Football League.

Career

Early career
Dawson would play for his school team and gradually went on to play for Goa U-16 in the Subroto Cup. It was then that he realised that he could continue to play football at the highest level. During his schooling days, his parents had no clue about his playing football, as he knew that they would never encourage him to continue. It was only when he wanted to play for the state team and next for Fransa-Pax FC that his parents became aware of it. To his fortune, they let him play for the state team.

Then he represented Salgaocar youth team through various championships, eventually representing his state at the U-19 national championship and was captain for the U-21 Goa side for the final of Dutta Trophy in 2009–10, which his team won thanks to a solitary goal from him, defeating hosts Haryana. He also went to Portugal for training with Primeira Liga club Vitória de Guimarães.

Sporting Goa
After spending 3 seasons at Salgaocar in the I-League, Fernandes signed for Sporting Goa also in the I-League. He made his debut for the club on 22 December 2011 against Dempo and he also scored in the match as Sporting lost 2–3. He then scored his second goal for the club on 1 February 2012 against Pune in the 91st minute in a match that ended with Sporting winning 4–2. In the next game against Chirag United Fernandes scored a double as Sporting came out 3–0 winners. He then scored another double in the last game of the season against HAL on 5 May 2012.

Salgaocar
On 31 May, Fernandes rejoined Salgaocar signing a one-year deal after an impressive season with Sporting.

International career

On 5 August 2013, Dawson received his first call for India for an International friendly match against Tajikistan on 14 August 2013. He made three appearances for his country.

Career statistics

Club

Honours

India
 SAFF Championship runner-up: 2013

See also

 Goans in football
 List of Indian football players in foreign leagues

References

External links

Dawson Fernandes at Flashscore

Indian footballers
1990 births
Living people
I-League players
People from South Goa district
Footballers from Goa
Sporting Clube de Goa players
India international footballers
Association football forwards
Indian expatriate footballers
Indian expatriate sportspeople in England